The University of Central Florida College of Medicine is an academic college of the University of Central Florida located in Orlando, Florida, United States. The VP of Health Affairs and dean  of the college is Deborah C. German, M.D.

The college consists of a public medical school and the Burnett School of Biomedical Sciences located on the UCF Health Sciences campus in Lake Nona Medical City.

The UCF Lake Nona Medical Center, a 64 bed acute care hospital that will serve as the school's main teaching hospital, opened in early 2021. In December 2018, UCF acquired the former Sanford Burnham Prebys Institute facility, which currently houses the UCF Lake Nona Cancer Center.

History
This $25 million was eligible for a matching grant from the state; thus giving UCF the needed $50 million to create a new medical college. UCF received well over $100 million in donations, state-matching funds, and land value for the medical college's establishment.

On March 23, 2006, the Florida Board of Governors voted 15–1 in support of UCF's proposal to build a medical college. The College of Medicine would consist of a new UCF medical campus that was constructed at Lake Nona; located on the eastern edge of Orlando near the Orlando International Airport.  Upon completion of the first phase, the base of the College of Medicine included a  building for the Burnett School of Biomedical Sciences, and a  College of Medicine instructional building and health sciences library.

The new College of Medicine offered an unprecedented full scholarship package to every member of its charter class; 41 students entering in fall 2009. The scholarship, financed by various donors, amounts to $40,000 per year, half going to tuition (out-of-state fees being waived) and the other half for living expenses. Dean German spearheaded the effort to secure these scholarships, having herself received a similar scholarship at Harvard Medical School. The new school received over 4,300 applications, including at least one with a perfect MCAT score, making it the most selective medical school in the United States at that time.

The UCF College of Medicine announced February 11, 2013, that it had received full accreditation from the LCME. On May 17, 2013, 36 students in the College of Medicine Charter Class graduated with their medical degrees.

Campus and facilities

UCF's College of Medicine is located on the University's Health Sciences Campus in the Lake Nona neighborhood of Orlando. The 50 acre (0.2 km2) campus is located on the eastern edge of Orlando, about 30 minutes from UCF's main campus. The Medical City also currently serves as a home to UCF's Burnett Biomedical Sciences Building,  Nemours Children’s Hospital, University of Florida Academic and Research Center,  and the Orlando Veterans Affairs Medical Center (VA).

In the future, the campus is slated to house the UCF's College of Nursing allied health professions programs and a teaching hospital.

Academics

Medical school

Admissions

Admission to the medical school is based mainly on GPA, Medical College Admission Test (MCAT) score, admissions essays, an interview, clinical work experience, and volunteering activities, along with research and leadership roles in the applicant's history. Background checks on applicants are required by the Association of Medical Colleges in order to prevent individuals with convictions for serious crimes from matriculating. In 2014, over 4,000 students applied for 120 spots. Matriculates had an average GPA of 3.80, a median MCAT score of 32, and average age of 25 years, with 11% of those admitted previously earning a postbaccalaureate degree.

Curriculum
The medical school began clinical education in fall 2009 with a charter class of 41. The college's enrollment has increased in subsequent years and will reach 480 at full enrollment. Full accreditation has been granted to the medical school, and the college has accepted applications for the fifth class of 120 students for Fall 2013 enrollment.

The medical school curriculum is four years long. The first two years are composed mainly of classroom basic sciences education, while the last two years primarily include rotations in clinical settings where students learn patient care firsthand. Clinical education is spread across all four years, with the final years being heavily weighted towards clinical rotations. The four-year medical program capitalizes on UCF's existing strengths in biomedical sciences, modeling and simulation.

Technology initiative
In December 2010 a local philanthropist, impressed by a demonstration of how iPads could be used to access resources from the library, gifted all 100 College of Medicine students with an iPad. The College of Medicine became one of three schools to give iPads to their students in 2010. The other two schools – Stanford and UC Irvine - only provided iPads to their incoming first-year students; making UCF College of Medicine the first medical school to provide all their students with iPads. In January 2011, all full-time teaching faculty at the College of Medicine also received iPads.

Since 2010, the Harriet F. Ginsburg Health Sciences Library has deployed iPads to incoming medical students during their orientation week in August. In the most recent deployment in 2013, students were given iPad Minis after studies showed that the Mini would work better with portability issues and would fit in white coat pockets better.

Burnett School of Biomedical Sciences
The Burnett School of Biomedical Sciences houses the Department of Molecular Biology and Microbiology, the Biomolecular Science Center, the Medical Laboratory Sciences Program and the Pre-Health Professions Advisement Office. The school offers three undergraduate degrees: a Bachelor of Science in Molecular Biology and Microbiology, a Bachelor of Science in Biotechnology, and a Bachelor of Science in Medical Laboratory Science. Two graduate degrees are also offered: a Master of Science in Molecular Biology and Microbiology and a Ph.D. program in Interdisciplinary Biomedical Science.

The school was named after Al and Nancy Burnett after receiving a $10 million donation from them. In August 2007, the program was converted to a school under the newly formed UCF College of Medicine from being an independent college. The goal of the school is to build a nationally recognized biomedical research and education enterprise. The Burnett School of Biomedical Sciences is housed in a  building on the health sciences campus which opened in 2009 and also on the main UCF campus.

Health Sciences Library

The Harriet F. Ginsburg Health Sciences Library was created during the 2009 founding of the College of Medicine through a gift from local philanthropist Alan Ginsburg. The library was named in honor of his late wife Harriet, who loved reading.

The library is located on the second floor of the College of Medicine Medical Education building at the Lake Nona UCF Health Sciences Campus. It has study areas, reading spaces, an information commons, and six public computer terminals. The library is 98% electronic with a goal of becoming 100% electronic in 5 years. In keeping with their goal of becoming 100% electronic, the Harriet F. Ginsburg Health Sciences Library has become the center of the College of Medicine’s iPad Initiative and deployment. The library has been honored by the Association of American Medical Colleges (AAMC) and by the Consortium of Southern Biomedical Libraries (CONBLS) as a leading medical electronic library for its innovative programs.

Degrees
The college currently offers baccalaureate, graduate, and professional degrees in five distinct programs.
 Biomedical Sciences
 Biomedical Neuroscience
 Biotechnology
 Medical Laboratory Sciences
 Medicine (M.D.)
 Molecular Biology and Microbiology

See also
 List of medical schools in the United States

References

External links

Medicine
2006 establishments in Florida
Educational institutions established in 2006
Medical schools in Florida
Medical research institutes in Florida
Universities and colleges in Orlando, Florida